The 1999 Nordic Figure Skating Championships were held from February 19 through 21, 1999 in Linköping, Sweden. The competition was open to elite figure skaters from Nordic countries. Skaters competed in two disciplines, men's singles and ladies' singles, across two levels: senior (Olympic-level) and junior.

Senior results

Men

Ladies

Junior results

Men

Ladies

External links
 1999 Nordics

Nordic Figure Skating Championships, 1999
Nordic Figure Skating Championships
Nordic Figure Skating Championships
International figure skating competitions hosted by Sweden
Sports competitions in Linköping